Jayanta Naskar  (1947/8 – 19 June 2021) was an Indian politician.

Biography
He served as MLA of Gosaba Vidhan Sabha Constituency in the West Bengal Legislative Assembly. He was an All India Trinamool Congress politician.

Death 
Naskar died at a hospital in Kolkata, India due to COVID-19.

References

1940s births
Year of birth uncertain
2021 deaths
Trinamool Congress politicians from West Bengal
Deaths from the COVID-19 pandemic in India
West Bengal MLAs 2011–2016
West Bengal MLAs 2016–2021
People from Howrah district